Central Land Division was a land division of Western Australia defined under section 26 of the Land Act Amendment Act 1906, and existed from 1 February 1907 until 28 March 1917, when it became part of the Eastern Land Division under section 4 of the Land Act Amendment Act 1917. It was bounded by the Rabbit-proof fence in the west, and included Kalgoorlie. It comprised parts of the eastern Wheatbelt and the Goldfields-Esperance region.

It was defined thus in the 1906 Act:

References

Land divisions of Western Australia